Princess DayaReese is a 2021 Philippine romantic comedy film starring Maymay Entrata and Edward Barber, directed by Barry Gonzalez. The film was released under Star Cinema and premiered on January 1, 2021 on KTX and iWantTFC, and on pay per view channels on Sky Cable and Cignal as well in selected cinemas in modified general community quarantine areas. The film's title is a play on the 2001 film The Princess Diaries.

Plot 
Reese (Maymay Entrata), a poor girl who only wants a happy ending was lured by the guarantee of cash, consents to pretend to be a princess of a kingdom so the real princess who looks like her can finally run away.

Cast 

Main
 Maymay Entrata as Princess Diana Reese "Reese" Termulo / Princess Ulap
 Edward Barber as Caleb "Cal" Abdon
Supporting
 Snooky Serna as Tita Sharon Termulo
 Neil Coleta as Denden Termulo
 Jeffrey Quizon as King Amala
 Pepe Herrera as Weda
 Chie Filomeno as Diwa
 Alora Sasam as Nini
 Iggy Boy Flores as Pak
 CJ Salonga as Sherlock Termulo
 Gold Azeron as Eliver Termulo
 Michael Flores as Governor Martin Abdon
 Issa Litton as Lisa Abdon

Release 
The film was premiered on January 1, 2021, directed by Barry Gonzalez. This serves as the second collaboration of Maymay Entrata, Edward Barber, and the director after the 2018 film Fantastica. The poster was posted via Instagram by the two main actors Maymay and Edward on December 17, 2020. The Official trailer was dropped on December 19, 2020.

The film was due to be released in August 2020 but was postponed and is now set to premiere in January 2021.

References

External links 

 

Philippine romantic comedy films
Star Cinema films
2021 films
2021 romantic comedy films